Liu Yuhuang (born July 25, 1959) is a retired Chinese long jumper, best known for finishing 5th at the 1984 Olympic Games.

Achievements

References

1959 births
Living people
Athletes (track and field) at the 1984 Summer Olympics
Chinese male long jumpers
Olympic athletes of China
Asian Games medalists in athletics (track and field)
Athletes (track and field) at the 1982 Asian Games
Universiade medalists in athletics (track and field)
Asian Games silver medalists for China
Medalists at the 1982 Asian Games
Universiade silver medalists for China
Medalists at the 1981 Summer Universiade
20th-century Chinese people